Sur – The Melody of Life is a 2002 Hindi musical film starring Lucky Ali and Gauri Karnik in the main leads. Its co-stars are  Simone Singh, Achint Kaur, Ehsaan Khan, Divya Dutta, Nitin, and Harsh Vashisht. This movie is loosely based on a 1992 Telugu musical hit film Swati Kiranam  which itself was inspired by the 1984 movie Amadeus.

Plot
Vikramaditya Singh is a teacher in a music school where he, with others, polishes every student's voice to make them stars. Although Vikramaditya is a famous singer himself, he is not satisfied with his creations; he is looking for a special person. His heart longs for someone so special that, if worked on, would be a masterpiece who would be known as the most worthy graduate and the world's most talented singer. He accidentally meets Tina, who has a magical voice. He learns about her when she sings a prayer in church. Vikramaditya decides to take her to his school, where she can pay more attention to singing. Vikramaditya moulds her into a brilliant singer, and she emerges a star. In spite of Vikramaditya's dream coming true, he starts feeling jealous when he discovers Tina's success. He is not able to take in the fact that she is better than he is, so he starts competing with her. He starts breaking her confidence, then dominates and overpowers her. Later, Vikramaditya realizes his mistake and compensates for it by letting her sing at a concert that was dedicated to him. Tina performs at the concert dedicating her love for Vikramaditya, and the concert is a huge success. Later, Tina goes to meet Vikram at his house, and feels grateful to Vikram and expresses her desire to sing with him. But Vikram rejects her proposal, telling her that she should sing alone and that he wants her to become a big name in the future. A heartbroken Tina leaves Vikram's house and continues her career, dedicating it to Vikram.

Cast
Lucky Ali as Vikramaditya Singh
Gauri Karnik as Tina Marie D'Silva
Simone Singh as Divya
Achint Kaur as Pooja, Music Company Assistant 
Surovi Sur as Playback Singer
Harsh Vashisht as Aqib
Divya Dutta as Rita D'Silva
Nitin
Ehsaan Khan Herman 
Yashodhan Bal as Vishal, Music Company Contractor

Soundtrack

The soundtrack was composed by M. M. Keeravani and lyrics were penned by Nida Fazli.

Critical reception
Taran Adarsh of IndiaFM gave the film 1.5 stars out 5, writing ″Lucky Ali enacts his part with utmost ease and is a complete natural. Camera friendly and confident, he provides ample evidence that a singer can make a good actor as well. Gauri Karnik looks ordinary, but is a bundle of talent. Simone Singh is first-rate. Achint Kaur and Divya Dutta lend adequate support. On the whole, SUR holds appeal for a select few in metros only. For the hoi polloi, looking for masala, the film has precious little to offer. Anita Bora of Rediff.com wrote ″Sur may not be rousing fare for the front-benchers, but it is a worthy attempt at exploring love and jealousy from a fresh angle. The film does a good job of taking you through the three hours without the usual hero-heroine singing-around-the-trees routine. Though the ending leaves you unsatisfied. After the build-up, music and emotions, the film ends abruptly. Backed by good music, Chandra's film has a fresh approach and is a mark above the usual fare found these days.

References

External links
 

2002 films
2000s Hindi-language films
Films about music and musicians
Films scored by M. M. Keeravani
Films directed by Tanuja Chandra